Kevin Bernard is a fictional character on the NBC crime drama Law & Order, portrayed by Anthony Anderson. Bernard appears in his position as a junior detective for part of the eighteenth season through what was at the time the final twentieth season of the show. He made his return in the twenty-first season as a senior detective.

Character overview
Detective Bernard first appears in the episode "Burn Card" as an Internal Affairs Bureau (IAB) detective, investigating a shooting in which long-time Detective Ed Green is involved. Bernard tells Van Buren he had not joined IAB willingly, but was told that he could try for a transfer to Homicide after a two-year tour of duty there. In the episode, Green is eventually cleared of all charges, but he subsequently leaves the precinct. Following Green's departure, Bernard replaces him as the partner of Detective Cyrus Lupo, who was promoted to senior detective. Bernard's detective shield number is 1954. In Season 21, (11 years later) his shield number is 1901.

Bernard's duty weapon is a Glock 19. In season 19, he and Lupo become the first main characters in the series to kill a suspect in the line of duty when they shoot a murder suspect who pulls a gun on them.

In terms of political views, Bernard's character represents a generally conservative influence in the detective squad of the show's fictional 27th Precinct. However, in the season 19 episode "Sweetie" he tells the bartender of a gay bar, "Trust me, I don't miss Dick Cheney." He is a practicing Catholic. He also advocates the criminalization of abortion. In the season 19 episode "Promote This", he says that he understands the anger toward illegal immigrants, as jobs in Compton, where he grew up, went to them primarily for the cheaper labor they were willing to provide.

One personal quirk that the show bestows on Bernard's character is that he does not like dogs, due to his nickname in Catholic school, "Saint Bernard".

Although the majority of the show as a whole focuses on office matters or other events during work hours, season 20 does give a deeper glimpse into Bernard's personal history and family life. During a courtroom scenario, it is revealed that he and a woman who was at the police academy at the same time as Bernard produced a son together whom Bernard does not see, as the woman married her later fiancé, and the boy believes that it is this man who is his actual father.

In season 21, Bernard was partnered up with Detective Frank Cosgrove and was working in the 2-7 Homicide unit.

Credits

References

Law & Order characters
Fictional African-American people
Fictional characters from California
Fictional New York City Police Department detectives
Television characters introduced in 2008
American male characters in television